Air Pennsylvania was a commuter airline active from 1976 to 1982 and based in Reading, Pennsylvania. It was owned by Eugene F. Plum II, whose family also operated a flight school and other airlines as Perkiomen Airways based in Reading, Pennsylvania and Sun International Airways in Puerto Rico.

Fleet
 Beech 18
 Britten Norman Islander
 Cessna 152
 Cessna 172
 Cessna 182
 Convair 240
 DC-3 (N2VM)
 Fairchild Hiller FH-227
 Piper Apache
 Piper Arrow
 Piper Navajo
 Piper Trainer

Destinations
New Jersey
Atlantic City (Atlantic City International Airport)
Pennsylvania
Allentown/Bethlehem/Easton (Lehigh Valley International Airport) 
Hazleton (Hazleton Municipal Airport)*
Philadelphia (Philadelphia International Airport)
Reading (Reading Regional Airport)*
Cumberland Regional Airport (Cumberland, Maryland)*
Pittsburgh, Pennsylvania (Greater Pittsburgh International Airport)**
Those airports marked with an asterisk (*) are no longer served by commercial air service.
Greater Pittsburgh International Airport was replaced by Pittsburgh International Airport, which is commercially serviced.

See also 
 List of defunct airlines of the United States

External links
Entry in Flight International Magazine

References

1976 establishments in Pennsylvania
Airlines based in Pennsylvania
Airlines disestablished in 1982
Airlines established in 1976
Companies based in Reading, Pennsylvania